Weavers Green is a British television soap opera, made in 1966 for ITV by Anglia Television. It was notable for being one of the first television programmes to be shot on location using videotape and outside broadcast equipment, rather than film, as had usually been the case for non-studio shooting until this point. It was the first rural soap opera.

Its budget was £500,000.

The series dealt with life in a small country town and provided an early TV role for Kate O'Mara as a student vet, a far cry from her later TV roles.

49 half hour episodes were produced, all written by Peter Lambda and his wife Betty Paul.

The village of Heydon, north of Reepham, Norfolk was used for the main outside filming, and County School railway station was also used for some scenes.

Cast: Eric Flynn, Megs Jenkins, Grant Taylor, Georgina Ward, Richard Coleman, Susan Field, Vanessa Forsyth, John Glyn-Jones, Maurice Kaufmann, Marjie Lawrence, John Moulder Brown, Pat Nye, Kate O'Mara, Wendy Richard, Gerald Young, Brian Cant, Edward Underdown, Susan George.

Unlike many ITV series of the 1960s, the series survives intact in the archives except for the untransmitted pilots.

References

External links

Weavers Green at the British Film Institute's Screenonline

1966 British television series debuts
1966 British television series endings
1960s British television soap operas
British television soap operas
ITV soap operas
Television series by ITV Studios
Television shows produced by Anglia Television
Black-and-white British television shows
English-language television shows